Jebel Ali Seaplane Base , abbreviated as Jebel Ali (SPB), is a Seaplane base in Jebel Ali, United Arab Emirates.

Airlines and destinations

References

External links 
 Jebel Ali Golf Resort information page for the Jebel Ali SPB forwards to home page, try archive version https://web.archive.org/web/20170629060355/http://www.jaresortshotels.com/Properties/JAGR/SportsLeisure/Seaplane.aspx.

Proposed buildings and structures in Dubai
Airports in the United Arab Emirates
Government-owned companies of the United Arab Emirates
Transport in Dubai